Revive (stylized as RE_vive) is the first cover studio album by South Korean girl group, Brown Eyed Girls. It also serves as the group's seventh studio album and the group's first comeback album since Basic in 2015. The album released on October 28, 2019, under APOP Entertainment and distributed by Kakao M. The album contains covers of different Korean songs from the 80's, 90's, and modern period.

Background
Following the release of Basic in 2015, Brown Eyed Girls took an unofficial four year hiatus, which the member Gain cited was due to her taking a personal leave from the group in order to be with family and take vocal lessons to expand her role in the group from dancing. Member JeA also moved to Jeju island while Miyro continued to be active on YouTube. Narsha left APOP Entertainment in 2018, also stating that she would continue being a member of Brown Eyed Girls. A statement regarding the matter from APOP also revealed that the 4 members were preparing for a comeback.

On January 28, 2019, APOP Entertainment confirmed the group was planning to come back in the first half of the year. However, the album was not confirmed to be completed until September, with a new release date of October 2019. On October 10, the release date was finalized as October 28, and the title was announced the next day. On October 22, the track list and a highlight medley for the album was revealed, showing that the album was to be a cover album. On October 24, the title tracks were revealed to be "Wonder Woman" and "Abandoned", and the album cover was revealed on October 26.

Release and reception
Revive was released on October 28, 2019, debuting at number 29 on the Gaon Chart and then peaking at number 24 the week after. It sold 5,673 copies. The album received positive reception, with Billboard describing the album as "a walk down memory lane of South Korea's sonic history with Brown Eyed Girls’ distinct artistic flare melded into it, adding something a little edgy and a little provocative into [the] songs."

Track listing

Charts

References

2019 albums
Korean-language albums
Brown Eyed Girls albums
Kakao M albums
Dance-pop albums by South Korean artists